Tatiana Fabergé (7 March 1930 – 13 February 2020) was a secretary, a Fabergé scholar, and jeweler from Switzerland.

Biography
Tatiana Fabergé was born in 1930 in Versoix, Geneva, Switzerland. Her parents were Fedor Fabergé (a son of Agathon Carl Theodor Fabergé) and Tatiana Borisovna Sheremeteva-Fabergé (the daughter of Boris Sergeevich Sheremetev and Princess Elisabed Aleksandres Asuli Bagration of Mukhrani). During the 1950s she studied jewellery design in Paris, where she was in contact with her uncles Eugene Fabergé and Alexander Fabergé. The Fabergé brothers had a store in Paris called Fabergé & Cie.

Tatiana Fabergé joined CERN—the European Organization for Particle Physics Research—as a secretary when the CERN Theory Group was moved from Copenhagen to Geneva. She retired from CERN in 1995.

Fabergé was always interested in the House of Fabergé. After retirement she worked researching the family history and promoting its heritage.

In 1974 she launched her own jewelry and product line Tatiana Fabergé which is marketed through her own web site. During her career she created several products under different trademarks, in 2005 Fabergé Ltd purchased from the Tatiana Fabergé SA one of the trademarks, Tatiana Fabergé SA then continued developing products under the Tsars Collection trademark.

From 2007, she was actively involved in giving advice and guidance via the Fabergé Heritage Council, a division of Fabergé Limited, regarding the relaunch of the brand. She worked closely with the creative team and advised on heritage matters.

After her death in February 2020, she bequeathed the Fabergé family archive to the Moscow Kremlin Museums.

Fauxbergé
According to an article published in 2020 by an art dealer specialized in Russian art and Fabergé, she was involved in authenticating several Fauxbergé eggs as genuine Fabergé items in order to be sold:

Publications
Her publications on Carl Fabergé include:

 The History of the House of Fabergé (1992). 
 The Fabergé Imperial Easter Eggs (1997), which incorporates a catalogue raisonné of Fabergé’s imperial eggs. 
 Fabergé and Saint Petersburg Jewellers (1997), which contains a comprehensive compilation of documents and publications relating to the House of Fabergé.
 Fabergé (2012).
 Fabergé: The Imperial "Empire" Egg of 1902 (2017), the last book in English, which was issued with Tatiana Fabergé's participation.

See also
 Fauxbergé

References

External links
Tatiana Fabergé SA website
Fabergé Ltd website

1930 births
People associated with CERN
Tatiana Faberge
2020 deaths
Women jewellers